Arino may refer to:

People
 Aitor Ariño (born 1992), Spanish handball player
 Amalia Sánchez Ariño (1883–1969), Argentinian actress
 Gaspar Ariño Ortiz (1936–2023), Spanish lawyer, professor, and politician
 Julia Arino (born 1991), Argentinian swimmer
 Manu Morlanes (born 1999), Spanish football player
 , Japanese comedian
 Yoshiharu Arino (born 1980), Japanese speed skater

Places
 Arino, Mari El Republic, Russia
 Ariño, Aragon, Spain

Japanese-language surnames